80/81 is a double album by jazz guitarist Pat Metheny, featuring tenor saxophonists Dewey Redman and Michael Brecker, acoustic bassist Charlie Haden and drummer Jack DeJohnette, which was released in 1980.

Metheny toured in the U.S. in fall 1980 with a quartet including Redman, Haden and drummer Paul Motian.  In the summer of 1981, he toured Europe with the full 80/81 lineup featured on the album.

Reception

In a review for AllMusic, Richard S. Ginell wrote that "Metheny's credibility with the jazz community went way up with the release of this package", and called the album "a superb two-CD collaboration with a quartet of outstanding jazz musicians that dared to be uncompromising at a time when most artists would have merely continued pursuing their electric commercial successes." An overview at The Music Aficionado refers to the album as "a double LP album for the ages" resulting from "one of the most productive and inspiring recording sessions in modern jazz", and notes: "Metheny didn't just ask four great musicians to come over for a session. He had a clear vision for how they will sound together, and wrote new music with their individual style and personality in mind. Interestingly, he also assembled  combinations of musicians who have not played or recorded with each other before."

Writing for MQS, Marc Zisman wrote: "On this copious one hour and twenty minute double album that's as electric... as it is acoustic, Pat Metheny shows all his colours, and writes the best part of the songs himself. Most importantly, these famed sidemen are stylistically a long-shot from his usual musical compadres. And the exchanges between this most-harmonious five are incredibly inspiring... Charlie Haden and Dewey Redman seamlessly accommodate our young guitar maestro... DeJohnette expertly weaves in and out of this tight canvas and is a central part of 80/81. The drummer carries a voice here that succeeds in standing out whilst remaining in harmony with others... the saxophonists voices are opposing yet succeed in cementing their own place... A double album which, as the years go by and after multiple listens, will stand strong among the vast discography of its artist."

In an article at Between Sound and Space, Tyran Grillo called the album a "still-fresh sonic concoction", and noted that "With 80/81, Pat Metheny took one step closer to his dream of working with The Prophet of Freedom (Ornette Coleman) (a dream he finally achieved with 1985's Song X)". He concluded: "Like much of what Metheny produces, 80/81 is wide open in two ways. First in its far-reaching vision, and second it its willingness to embrace the listener. Like a dolly zoom, he enacts an illusion of simultaneous recession and approach, lit like a fuse that leads not to an explosion, but to more fuse."

JazzTimes included the album in an article titled "10 Best Jazz Albums of the 1980s: Critics' Picks", in which Philip Booth stated: "Enlisting four of the musicians he most admired... the 26-year-old guitarist successfully translated the sound in his head to beautifully open, airy, sometimes urgent recordings."

Track listing

Personnel
 Pat Metheny – acoustic and electric guitars
 Michael Brecker – tenor saxophone (on tracks Disc 1: 1,4; Disc 2: 1–3)
 Dewey Redman – tenor saxophone (on tracks Disc 1: 3, Disc 2: 1,2)
 Charlie Haden – double bass
 Jack DeJohnette – drums

References

1980 albums
Pat Metheny albums
Albums produced by Manfred Eicher
ECM Records albums